Cho Youn-jeong (born September 29, 1969) is a South Korean archer. A two-time Olympic gold medalist, she achieved both her gold medals at the 1992 Summer Olympics in Barcelona. She also won an individual silver medal at the 1993 World Archery Championships, as well as a gold medal with the team.

1992 Summer Olympics
Cho contested the 1992 Summer Olympics as a member of the South Korean women's archery team with Kim Soo-nyung and Lee Eun-kyung. During the ranking round of the women's individual competition she set two Olympic records, scoring 338 points from a distance of 70 metres and 345 points from a distance of 60 metres. Cho and her teammates' total combined score of 4,094 points was additionally a new Olympic record for the women's team competition.

Cho defeated Kim, the defending Olympic champion, in the final of the women's individual event, outshooting her teammate by seven points to claim the gold medal. She later achieved her second gold medal in the women's team event after the South Korean team defeated China.

References

External links

1969 births
Living people
South Korean female archers
Olympic archers of South Korea
Archers at the 1992 Summer Olympics
Olympic gold medalists for South Korea
Olympic medalists in archery
Medalists at the 1992 Summer Olympics